Cyprus is a station on the Docklands Light Railway (DLR) located in Cyprus, to the south of Beckton, in the Docklands area of Newham, east London. It is named after the Mediterranean island of Cyprus. The station serves the University of East London Docklands Campus and the eastern end of the north quay of the Royal Albert Dock.

The station is located on the DLR's Beckton branch, between Beckton Park and Gallions Reach stations. It is in Travelcard Zone 3. It is served by DLR services from Tower Gateway to Beckton.

Layout
Along with Beckton Park, Cyprus station is of an unusual design. Between the two stations, the DLR runs in the median of a major road built at the same time as the railway. The stations are located at highway intersections which take the form of roundabouts. On the approach to the roundabout, the road rises slightly whilst the railway dips slightly; the station is therefore situated in a cutting, under the centre of the elevated roundabout, with pedestrian access at surface level under the elevated roadways and arched over the railway.

Connections
London Buses routes 101, 262, 366, 376, 474, 678, and night route N551 serve the station.

References

External links 

 Docklands Light Railway website – Cyprus station page

Docklands Light Railway stations in the London Borough of Newham
Railway stations in Great Britain opened in 1994
Beckton